Eduardo Noriega may refer to:

Eduardo Noriega (Mexican actor) (1916–2007), Mexican film actor
Eduardo Noriega (Spanish actor) (born 1973), Spanish film actor